Eupithecia nigritaria is a moth in the family Geometridae. It is found in Turkey.

References

Moths described in 1879
nigritaria
Moths of Asia